The 1906–07 Army Cadets men's ice hockey season was the 4th season of play for the program.

Season
Army's third season in ice hockey brought about its first losing record. The Cadets played so poorly at the end of the year that they were shutout by two secondary schools.

Roster

Standings

Schedule and Results

|-
!colspan=12 style=";" | Regular Season

References

Army Black Knights men's ice hockey seasons
Army
Army
Army
Army